Thuy Dung Nguyen (born ) is a road cyclist from Vietnam. In 2012, she won The Princess Maha Chackri Sirindhon's Cup.

References

External links
 profile at Procyclingstats.com

Vietnamese female cyclists
Living people
Place of birth missing (living people)
1978 births
21st-century Vietnamese women